Laxmi Narayan Gupta was an Indian politician from the state of the Madhya Pradesh.
He represented Pichhore Vidhan Sabha constituency in Madhya Pradesh Legislative Assembly by winning General election of 1952 देश के सबसे वरिष्ठ  भाजपा नेता जो 1952 में विधायक बने थे.

References 

Year of birth missing
Year of death missing
Madhya Pradesh MLAs 1957–1962
People from Shivpuri district